Kuqa Qiuci Airport  is an airport serving Kuqa County in Xinjiang Autonomous Region, China.  It is located 38 kilometers from the city.  The airport was first built in 1939, but ceased operation in 1998.  In 2009 it was moved and rebuilt at its current location with an investment of 333 million yuan, and was reopened in 2011 under the new name Kuqa Qiuci Airport, after the ancient kingdom based in Kuqa.

Facilities
It has one runway which measures .

Airlines and destinations

See also
 List of airports in China

References

External links
 

Airports in Xinjiang